Stroop is a Dutch surname.  Notable people with the name include:

 John Ridley Stroop (1897–1973), American psychologist, after whom the Stroop effect was named
 Jürgen Stroop (1895–1952), German SS commander responsible for the liquidation of the Warsaw Ghetto; executed for war crimes
 Paul D. Stroop (1904–1995), officer of the United States Navy and a naval aviator

See also
 Stroup (disambiguation)

Dutch-language surnames